Susan Gibney (born September 11, 1961) is an American actress.

Early life and education
Gibney was born in Manhattan Beach, California. She moved to Webster, New York, at a young age, returned to California several times, returning to Webster in 2004. She graduated from Buffalo State College with a major in theater, and later earned a Master of Fine Arts degree from the Yale School of Drama.

Career
On television, Gibney portrayed Maggie Harris on Happy Family, Janis Archer on Diagnosis: Murder, and Rene Walcott on Crossing Jordan. She appeared twice on Star Trek: The Next Generation as Dr. Leah Brahms, once in the episode "Booby Trap" and later in "Galaxy's Child". She also appeared on Star Trek: Deep Space Nine, in the episodes "Homefront" and "Paradise Lost", as Commander (later Captain) Erika Benteen. She was considered for the role of Captain Kathryn Janeway on Star Trek: Voyager, but did not get the role. She was later considered for the role of Seven of Nine and tested twice. She was also considered, but likewise rejected, for the role of the Borg Queen in the film Star Trek: First Contact.

Post Star Trek, Gibney has appeared in a number of movies, the most critically acclaimed one being We Are Still Here,  a 2015 American horror film written and directed by Ted Geoghegan.

Filmography

Film

Television

References

External links
 
 
 

Living people
Actors from Manhattan Beach, California
Buffalo State College alumni
Yale School of Drama alumni
American film actresses
American stage actresses
American television actresses
Actresses from California
People from Webster, New York
20th-century American actresses
21st-century American actresses
Year of birth missing (living people)